The following is a list of films produced in the Kannada film industry in India in 1978, presented in alphabetical order.

References

External links
Bhratmovies
Kannadastore

See also

Kannada films of 1977
Kannada films of 1979

1978
Lists of 1978 films by country or language
Films, Kannada